Ian James Michael Lumsden (6 April 1923 – August 2008) was a Scottish rugby union international.

Rugby Union career

Provincial career

He represented the Scotland Probables side in 1947.

International career

Lumsden, a full-back and occasional fly half, was capped seven times in Tests for Scotland. These appearances came in both the 1947 and 1949 Five Nations Championships.

Cricket career

He also played first-class cricket with the Scottish national team and the Combined Services during the 1940s. A middle order batsman, Lumsden made 379 runs at 27.07 from his seven first-class matches. He made three half centuries, two of which, including his highest score of 66, came in a drawn match with Warwickshire at Edgbaston in 1948.

See also
 List of Scottish cricket and rugby union players

References

External links
Cricinfo: Ian Lumsden

1923 births
2008 deaths
Combined Services cricketers
Cricketers from Edinburgh
Rugby union players from Edinburgh
Scotland international rugby union players
Scotland Probables players
Scottish cricketers
Scottish rugby union players
Rugby union fullbacks